Vaasu Naan Pakka Commercial is a 2018 Kannada language  film written and directed by Ajithvasan Uggina. It stars Anish Tejeshwar and Nishvika Naidu.

Plot
Mahalakshmi is the daughter of a rich businessman and thinks about everything commercially. She is madly in love with Vaasu who is a son of a real-estate broker. A misunderstanding between the duo separates them. What happens later forms the crux of the story.

Cast
 Anish Tejeshwar as Vasudev aka Vaasu
 Nishvika Naidu as Mahalakshmi
 Avinash
 Raj Deepak Shetty 
 Archana Kottige as Vasu's sister
 Manjunath Hegde
 Aruna Balraj
 Vinay Krishnaswamy
 Nandagopal MK as Nanda

Soundtrack

Critical reception
Times of India gave 2.5 stars stating, "This film might just be the film you choose to watch if you're looking for the masala entertainer with songs, action, comedy and romance."

References

External links 
 

2010s Kannada-language films
2018 films